Solitaire is any tabletop game which one can play by oneself, usually with cards, but also with dominoes. The term "solitaire" is also used for single-player games of concentration and skill using a set layout tiles, pegs or stones. These games include peg solitaire and mahjong solitaire.  The game is most often played by one person, but can incorporate others.

History
The origins of Card Solitaire or Patience are unclear, but the earliest records appear in the late 1700s across northern Europe and Scandinavia. The term Patiencespiel appears in Das neue Königliche L’Hombre-Spiel, a German book published in 1788. Books were also reported to appear in Sweden and Russia in the early 1800s. There are additional references to Patience in French literature. In the United States, the first card solitaire book, Patience: A series of thirty games with cards, was published by Ednah Cheney in 1870.

The most popular card solitaire is Klondike, which was called Microsoft Solitaire in a digital implementation included with the Windows operating system from 1990 onwards.

Types of solitaire games

 Patience or card solitaire, also known as "solitaire with cards", generally involves placing cards in a layout, and sorting them according to specific rules. The most common solitaire card game is Klondike. Other popular variations include Spider, Yukon, and FreeCell.
 Mahjong solitaire is a single-player matching game that uses a set of mahjong tiles rather than playing cards. It is more commonly played on a computer, than as a physical tabletop game.
 Peg solitaire is a board game where the goal is to empty the board of pegs through movement and capturing.  It is more of a puzzle than a game, since it is repeatable once it is solved.
 Concentration also known as Memory, Pelmanism or simply Pairs, is a card game in which all of the cards are laid face down on a surface and two cards are flipped face up over each turn. The object of the game is to turn over pairs of matching cards.

See also

List of patience games

References

External links
 David Parlett. Historic Card Games: Patience playing-card solitaires

Single-player games
 
Patience games